Zeynəddin, Agdash may refer to:
Aşağı Zeynəddin
Yuxarı Zeynəddin